The 10th New Brunswick Legislative Assembly represented New Brunswick between February 7, 1831, and 1834.

The assembly sat at the pleasure of the Governor of New Brunswick Sir Archibald Campbell.

William Crane was chosen as speaker for the house.

History

Members

Notes:

References
Journal of the House of Assembly of the province of New- Brunswick from ... February to ... March, 1831 (1831)

Terms of the New Brunswick Legislature
1831 in Canada
1832 in Canada
1833 in Canada
1834 in Canada
1831 establishments in New Brunswick
1834 disestablishments in New Brunswick